Thomas Walker (5 February 185810 May 1932), commonly referred to as Tommy Walker, was an Australian politician, a member of the New South Wales Legislative Assembly and the Western Australian Legislative Assembly.

Walker was born in Preston, Lancashire, England, the son of corn miller and merchant Thomas Walker, and Ellen née Eccles. He was educated at Leyland Grammar School, then worked as a schoolteacher at Preston for two years. He then emigrated to Canada, where he worked as a farmhand and chemist's assistant.  After returning to the United Kingdom he work as a journalist on the Preston Herald. He later spent some time in Toledo, Ohio, where he spent 1876 lecturing on evolution and the occult. The following year he toured through New South Wales, England and South Africa, lecturing on spiritualism and politics. While in South Africa in 1881, he married Andrietta Maria Somers, with whom he had two sons and two daughters.

Walker returned to Australia in 1882, spending some time in Victoria before settling in New South Wales. He became a prominent public figure through his political lectures, in which he argued for secularism and an immediate separation of New South Wales from England. In February 1885 he played a prominent role in a meeting held to discuss British government policy towards the Pacific Islands, and shortly afterwards he was involved in opposing the deployment of New South Wales troops to the Sudan.

On 17 February 1887 Walker was elected to the New South Wales Legislative Assembly seat of Northumberland as a Protectionist. He continued to push for separation from England, helping to form the short-lived Republican Union and Republican League. He held his Legislative Assembly seat until the election of 25 June 1894, when he unsuccessfully contested the seat of Wallsend. He contested the seat again the following year without success.

Some time after 1894, Walker visited New Zealand, where he taught elocution, promoted temperance, lectured on various subjects, and wrote for the press. On returning to New South Wales he unsuccessfully contested the seat of Sturt in 1898.

In 1899, Walker emigrated to Western Australia. He found work as a journalist with the Sunday Times in Perth, and later with the Kalgoorlie newspapers Sun and Kalgoorlie Miner. He became editor of the Sunday Times in 1901, and was also editor of the Sun until 1905. It was while editor for the Sunday Times  that he is believed to have written the article "Corruption by Contract" condemning C.Y.O'Connor and the Golden Pipeline scheme. This article is generally believed to have contributed to O'Connor's suicide. 

On 27 October 1905, Walker was elected to the Western Australian Legislative Assembly seat of Kanowna on a Labor ticket. He held the seat until his death over 25 years later.  From around 1906 he began studying law, and in 1911 was admitted to the Western Australian bar. He was a member of the Senate of the University of Western Australia from 1912 to 1916.

When the Labor party won government under John Scaddan on 7 October 1911, Walker was appointed Minister for Justice and Education, and Attorney General. He held both portfolios until the Scaddan government's defeat on 27 July 1916.  He was Speaker of the Western Australian Legislative Assembly from 24 July 1924 to 29 July 1930.

References

 

1858 births
1932 deaths
Attorneys-General of Western Australia
Burials at Karrakatta Cemetery
English male journalists
Members of the Western Australian Legislative Assembly
Members of the New South Wales Legislative Assembly
Protectionist Party politicians
Speakers of the Western Australian Legislative Assembly
English emigrants to colonial Australia
Australian Labor Party members of the Parliament of Western Australia
Politicians from Lancashire
English emigrants to Canada